The Pilot (also known as Danger in the Skies) is a 1980 American action-drama film by director and star Cliff Robertson and is based on the novel of the same name by Robert P. Davis.

Plot summary
Mike Hagan is an airline pilot of nineteen years experience. He started off in the open cockpit as a crop duster. A cool, capable aviator, he is being considered by his airline for its pilot of the year award. However, this façade conceals a troubled man with a failing marriage who is an alcoholic. The film opens as he awakens hungover and begins the day with a stiff drink and an argument with his shrewish wife. The only bright spots in his life are his loving relationship with his daughter Cricket and his girlfriend Pat.

Hagan's skill at the controls is shown when he guides his plane through turbulence that almost causes another airliner to crash. However, a stewardess and Hagan's co-pilot begin to suspect trouble when they notice him continually going to the lavatory with a cup. Hagan keeps a bottle hidden there and begins to drink while he is flying. In denial, he keeps saying that he has it under control. After a harrowing flight in which Hagan makes an emergency landing, almost running out of fuel, his co-pilot refuses to fly with him again.

Hagan consults Dr. O'Brian, a psychiatrist, who teaches him how to cut down on his drinking and gives him medication.  The airline assigns a veteran aviator, Larry Zanoff, as Hagan's co-pilot with a secret mission of monitoring Hagan's behavior to determine if Hagan has a problem.  The psychiatric therapy is working as Hagan reduces his drinking.  Zanoff begins to like Hagan and respect his abilities as a pilot.  The film ends as Hagan narrowly averts disaster as the plane's engines catch fire during takeoff. He is acclaimed as a hero.  But Hagan's uniform jacket had fallen to the flight deck in the cockpit during the engine fire incident and Zanoff inadvertently finds a small liquor flask in the jacket as he picks up the jacket so he could hand it to Hagan.  Hagan tells Zanoff the truth. He resigns his job with the airline and goes back to cropdusting. However, he finally comes to terms with his addiction and plans a happy future with Pat. His doctor tells him the motto of Alcoholics Anonymous: "Take it one day at a time."

Cast
 Cliff Robertson as Mike Hagan
 Diane Baker as Pat Simpson
 Frank Converse as Jim Cochran
 Gordon MacRae as Joe Barnes
 Milo O'Shea as Dr. O'Brian
 Dana Andrews as Randolph Evers
 Edward Binns as Larry Zanoff

See also
 Flight (2012)

External links 
 

1980 films
1980s action drama films
American action drama films
American aviation films
Films based on American novels
Films about alcoholism
Films scored by John Addison
1980 drama films
1980s English-language films
1980s American films